Kevin Damien Keelan MBE (born 5 January 1941) is an English former professional footballer who played as a goalkeeper. He spent the majority of his career with Norwich City, though he also played for Aston Villa, Stockport County, Wrexham, New England Tea Men and Tampa Bay Rowdies.

Keelan was appointed a Member of the Order of the British Empire (MBE) in the 1980 Birthday Honours "for services to Norwich City Football Club."

Playing career

Keelan was born in British India where his father was serving in the Army.

After beginning his career with Kidderminster Harriers, he had spells with Aston Villa, Stockport County, Kidderminster Harriers again and Wrexham before signing for Norwich City in the summer of 1963. Between then and 1980 he would make 673 first-team appearances for City, a club record.

He was twice City Player of the Year and played for the City side which lost the 1973 League Cup Final to Tottenham Hotspur.

In both 1978 and 1979, Norwich City sent Keelan on loan to the New England Tea Men of the North American Soccer League for the summer season. He was named in the 1978 NASL All-Star Team.

Coaching career
While playing for the Tampa Bay Rowdies in 1981, Keelan also served as an assistant manager, a position he retained in 1982. In July 1982, he also served as the interim manager when Gordon Jago resigned. In June 1991, the University of Tampa hired Keelan as the goalkeeper coach for the men's soccer team. In February 1997, he replaced Peter Mellor as the goalkeeper coach for the Tampa Bay Mutiny of Major League Soccer.

In an interview for the Norwich City matchday programme on 30 April 2006, Keelan confirmed that he runs goalkeeping schools in Cape Coral and Tampa Florida and coaches "pretty much every night". He also stated that for 20 years he has worked for a company that manufactures contact lenses and distributes them all over the world, but plans to retire at the end of 2006 to concentrate on his coaching. He is also a staff coach with the Florida Soccer Club.

References

External links
Career information at ex-canaries.co.uk
Football League stats
NASL stats

Sources
Canary Citizens by Mark Davage, John Eastwood, Kevin Platt, published by Jarrold Publishing, (2001), 

Living people
1941 births
Footballers from Kolkata
Association football goalkeepers
Aston Villa F.C. players
English footballers
English expatriate footballers
Expatriate soccer players in the United States
Kidderminster Harriers F.C. players
North American Soccer League (1968–1984) indoor players
New England Tea Men players
North American Soccer League (1968–1984) players
North American Soccer League (1968–1984) coaches
Norwich City F.C. players
Tampa Bay Rowdies (1975–1993) players
Stockport County F.C. players
Wrexham A.F.C. players
Tampa Bay Rowdies coaches
Player-coaches
English expatriate sportspeople in the United States
English football managers
Members of the Order of the British Empire